Let's Get Married is a 1960 British comedy drama film directed by Peter Graham Scott and starring Anthony Newley, Anne Aubrey and Hermione Baddeley. The film was shot at MGM British Studios in Elstree with sets designed by the art director Ken Adam.

Synopsis
It is about a medical student who is thrown out of his university, ends up working in a laundry and rebuilds his confidence with a relationship with a fashion model. The film features Newley singing the song "Do You Mind", which also reached #1 in the British Hit Singles chart the same year.

Cast

 Anthony Newley as Dickie Bird
 Anne Aubrey as Anne Linton
 Bernie Winters as Bernie
 Hermione Baddeley as Mrs O'Grady
 James Booth as Photographer
 Jack Gwillim as Doctor Saunders
 Lionel Jeffries as Marsh
 Diane Clare as Glad
 John Le Mesurier as Dean
 Victor Maddern as Works Manager
 Joyce Carey as Miss Finch
 Sydney Tafler as Pendle
 Betty Marsden as Miss Kaplan
 Cardew Robinson as Salesman
 Meier Tzelniker as Schutzberger
 Nicholas Parsons as RAF Officer
 Paul Whitsun-Jones as Uncle Herbert
 Margaret Tyzack as Staff Nurse

References

External links

1960 films
1960 comedy-drama films
British comedy-drama films
Films directed by Peter Graham Scott
Films shot at MGM-British Studios
1960s English-language films
1960s British films